Uthopia (born 23rd April 2001) is a Dutch Warmblood stallion ridden by the British equestrian Carl Hester in the sport of dressage.

Hester and Uthopia were selected to represent Great Britain in the 2012 London Olympics winning gold in the team dressage. Together they have won a total of five Championship medals two individual silvers at the 2011 European Championships in addition to Olympic gold. The horse has also been ridden in competition by Hester's protégé Charlotte Dujardin, most recently at the Amsterdam leg of the FEI World Cup series in January.

References 

Dressage horses
2001 animal births
Horses in the Olympics
Dutch Warmbloods